The 5th edition of Miss Diva took place on 11 October 2017. The top 15 contestants selected from all over the country competed in the pageant. 

All contestants were mentored by Miss Universe 2000 Lara Dutta . Throughout the 6-episodic reality series there were a series of challenges wherein the contestants were given scores. At the end of the 5th episode the 3 contestants with the 3 lowest scores were eliminated and the remaining 12 contestants advanced to the finale which was the 6th episode.

At the finale held on 11 October 2017, Roshmitha Harimurthy along with the reigning Miss Universe 2016 Iris Mittenaere crowned Shraddha Shashidhar as Miss Universe India 2017 , while Srinidhi Shetty crowned Peden Ongmu as Miss Supranational India 2017 and Aradhana Buragohain crowned Apeksha Porwal as Miss Diva 2017 2nd runner up. The two winners represented India at Miss Universe 2017, Miss Supranational 2017.

Final results
Color keys

Special Awards

Contestants

Judges
Lara Dutta – Miss Universe 2000
Iris Mittenaere – Miss Universe 2016
Chuck Russell – Hollywood Director
Rajkumar Rao
Vijender Singh
Kabir Khan (director)

Crossover
Miss Diva
2018: Elisha Mayor
Femina Miss India
2013: Vijaya Sharma
2015: Apeksha Porwal 
2019: Telangana : Tejaswini Manogna 

Miss Earth India
2016: Shweta Gadad
2019: Tejaswini Manogna 

 International beauty pageant 

Miss Supranational
2013: Vijaya Sharma 
'Miss Earth
2019: Tejaswini Manogna

References

External links
 Official site

2017 beauty pageants
October 2017 events in India
Miss Diva